The Transnet Freight Rail Class  of 2009 is a South African diesel-electric locomotive.

Near the end of 2009, the first of fifty Class  Electro-Motive Diesel type GT26CU-3 diesel-electric locomotives were placed in service by Transnet Freight Rail. The locomotives were built new after an earlier project to rebuild older locomotives to Class  locomotives was aborted.

Manufacture

The Class 39-000 project
In 2005, Transwerk, later renamed Transnet Rail Engineering (TRE) and in 2013 Transnet Engineering, commenced a project to rebuild existing locomotives to Class  locomotives for Spoornet. The Electro-Motive Diesel type EMD  diesel-electric locomotives were to be rebuilt from Classes  and  type GT26MC and Class  type GT26M2C locomotives. The original locomotives had all been designed by General Motors Electro-Motive Division  and had been built by General Motors South Africa (GMSA) in Port Elizabeth between 1974 and 1981. Suitable frames from wrecked locomotives were used.

The rebuilding was done at the Transwerk shops in Bloemfontein. It was intended to produce one hundred Class , but in spite of the technical success of the TRE part of the project, rebuilding was halted after completing only five locomotives, allegedly due to higher than anticipated cost. Instead of rebuilding one hundred old locomotives, it was decided to rather continue the program by building fifty new Class  locomotives.

The new Class 39-200
The Class  locomotives were built new from imported and locally produced components at the Koedoespoort TRE shops east of Pretoria, in collaboration with EMD. By October 2009, more than twenty locomotives had been built and were undergoing road testing. By April 2010, the last of the fifty locomotives came off the production line, thereby completing the building project in twelve months.

Features
Characteristics which distinguish the Class  from the existing TFR diesel-electric locomotive fleet, which was more than three decades old at the time, are features such as EM2000 microprocessor control, 26% more maximum continuous tractive effort and 15% more tractive horsepower compared to a Class , and a Knorr-Bremse electronic brake rack (EBR) instead of the old pneumatic braking controls.

The EM2000 control system featured in the Class  is a proprietary EMD microprocessor-based system which offers improved performance and reliability compared with older locomotives. It manages all critical operating functions and greatly improves tractive effort, while its creep control attains high- and low-speed adhesion advantages.

Service
The Class  locomotives were placed in service on the line between the Mpumalanga Lowveld and northern KwaZulu-Natal, working from Lydenburg via Swaziland and Golela to the coal export harbour at Richards Bay. In 2013, some Class  were also observed at the Pyramid South locomotive depot north of Pretoria, along with the five predecessor Class .

Illustration
All the Class  locomotives were delivered in the Transnet Freight Rail livery.

References

3520
C+C locomotives
Co′Co′ locomotives
Co+Co locomotives
Electro-Motive Diesel locomotives
Transnet Rail Engineering locomotives
Cape gauge railway locomotives
Railway locomotives introduced in 2009
2009 in South Africa